Harriet is a female name.

The name is an English version of the French Henriette, a female form of Henri. The male name  Harry was formed in a similar way from Henry. All these names are derived from Henrik, which is ultimately derived from the Germanic name Heimiric, derived from the word elements heim, or "home" and ric, meaning "power, ruler". The male name Henry was first used in England by Normans. Popular nicknames for Harriet or Harriett include Hattie, Hatty, Hetty, Hettie, Hennie, Harolda, Harry, Harri, Harrie, and Etta or Ettie. The name can be lengthened to Harrietta, Henriette, or Henrietta.

The name was the 73rd most popular name for baby girls born in England and Wales in 2007. It last ranked in the top 1,000 most popular names for girls in the United States in the 1960s.

Variants 

Drika (Dutch)
Endika (Basque)
Enrica, Enrichetta, Errichetta (Italian)
Enriqueta (Spanish)
Etta (English)
Etti (English)
Ettie (English)
Etty (English)
Haliaka (Hawaiian)
Halle (English)
Hallie (English)
Hani (Australian)
Hariala (Hawaiian)
Hariata (Hawaiian)
Harrieta (English)
Harriet (English)
Harriët (Dutch)
Harriett (English)
Harrietta (English)
Harriette (English)
Harriot (English)
Harriott (English)
Hat (English)
Hatsy (English)
Hatt (English/Scots)
Hatti (English)
Hattie (English)
Hatty (English)
Hazza (English)
Heike (Dutch, Frisian, German)
Heinrike (German)
Heintje (Dutch)
Hendrika (Dutch)
Hendrikje (Dutch)
Henka (Polish)
Henna (Finnish)
Hennie (Dutch, English)
Henny (Dutch, English)
Henrieta (Polish)
Henrietta (English, Hungarian)
Henriette (Danish, Dutch, French, German, Norwegian)
Henriikka (Finnish)
Henrika (Swedish)
Henrike (German, Scandinavian)
Henriqueta (Portuguese)
Henryka (Polish)
Hetta (English)
Hetti (English)
Hettie (English)
Hetty (English)
Jetje (Dutch)
Jindřiška (Czech)
Έρρικα (Errica, Errika) (Greek)
Riette (English)
Rika (Dutch, Swedish)
Rike (German)
Riikka (Finnish)
Yetta (English)
Yettie (English)
Harrie (English)
Hari (English)

As a given name 
 Harriet Adams (1892–1982), American juvenile novelist
 Harriet Chalmers Adams (1875-1937), American writer, explorer and photographer
 Harriet Andersson (born 1937), Swedish actress
 Harriet Arbuthnot (1793–1834), English diarist, social observer, and political hostess
 Harriett Ellen Grannis Arey (1819-1901), American educator, author, editor, publisher
 Harriet Pritchard Arnold (1858-1901), American author 	
 Harriet Auber (1773–1862), English poet, hymnwriter 
 Harriet Backer (1845-1932), Norwegian painter
 Harriett Baldwin (born 1960), British politician
 Harriet Bates (1856-1886), American novelist, poet 
 Harriet Blackstone (1864–1939), American artist
 Harriet Bland (1915-1991), Olympic gold medal-winning sprinter
 Harriet Bosse (1878–1961), Swedish-Norwegian actress
 Harriet Boyd-Hawes (1871–1945), American archaeologist
 Harriet G. Brittan (1822–1897), British-born American missionary
 Harriet Brooks (1876–1933), Canadian nuclear physicist
 Harriet Bruce-Annan (born 1965), Ghanaian programmer and humanitarian
 Harriet E. Clark (1850-1945), American teacher and author 
 Harriet Ludlow Clarke (died 1866), British artist
 Harriet Abbott Lincoln Coolidge (1849-1902), American author, philanthropist, reformer 
 Harriet L. Cramer (1847-1922), American newspaper publisher
 Harriet Ball Dunlap (1867-1957), American social reformer
 Harriet Elphinstone-Dick (1852–1902), early English-Australian swimming champion
 Harriet Ford (1868–1929), American actress, playwright 
 Harriet Putnam Fowler (1842–1901), American writer
 Harriet Schneider French (1824–1906), American physician and temperance movement activist
 Harriet Whitney Frishmuth (1880-1980), American sculptor
 Harriet E. Garrison (1848–1930), American physician, writer 
 Harriet Newell Kneeland Goff (1828-1901), American author, temperance reformer 	
 Harriet Harman (born 1950), UK politician and former Deputy Leader of the Labour Party
 Harriet Newell Haskell (1835-1907), American educator and administrator 
 Harriet Hemings (1801–1870), one of four mixed-race children born to Sally Hemings
 Harriet Howard (1823–1865), mistress of Napoleon III
 Harriet Lane Huntress (1860-1922), Deputy Superintendent Public Instruction in New Hampshire, USA
 Harriet Jacobs (1813–1897), American abolitionist and writer
 Harriet Jones (musician) (born 1993), British singer
 Harriet B. Jones (1856–1943), the first woman to be licensed as a physician in West Virginia
 Harriet Keopuolani (1778–1823), Hawaiian queen
 Harriet McEwen Kimball (1834–1917), American poet, hymnwriter, philanthropist, hospital co-founder 
 Harriet Knowles (fl. 1845), the first actress in Australia
 Harriet Lane (1830–1903), niece of bachelor President James Buchanan and First Lady of the United States
 Harriet Lerner (born 1944), American feminist and clinical psychologist
 Harriet Lindeman (born 1946), Finnish politician
 Harriet Low (1809–1877), American diarist
 Hattie Mahood (1860–1940), British Baptist deacon and women's suffragist
 Harriet Martineau (1802–1876), English writer, feminist philosopher, and political economist
 Harriet Metcalf (born 1958), US Olympic gold medal-winning rower
 Harriet Miers (born 1945), Republican lawyer and politician
 Harriet Taylor Mill (1807–1858), philosopher and women's rights advocate
 Harriet Mann Miller (1831–1918), American author, naturalist, ornithologist 
 Harriet Nahanee (1935–2007), Canadian Aboriginal rights activist
 Harriet Nahienaena (1815–1836), Hawaiian princess
 Harriet Ndow (1926 - 2019), Gambian educator
 Harriet Nelson (1909–1994), American singer and actress best known for The Adventures of Ozzie and Harriet
 Harriet Owen (cyclist) (born 1993), British cyclist
 Harriet Quimby (1875-1912), first American female pilot and first woman to fly across the English channel
 Harriet Newell Ralston (1828-1920), American poet
 Harriet Redmond (c.1862–1952), African-American suffragist
 Harriet Roberts, stage name Harriet (born 1966), British dance pop singer
 Harriët van Reek (born 1957), Dutch writer and illustrator
 Harriet Richardson (1874–1958), American carcinologist
 Harriet Samuel (1836–1908), English businesswoman and founder the jewellery retailer H. Samuel
 Harriet Anne Scott (1819–1894), English novelist
 Harriet Smithson (1800–1854), Irish actress and first wife of Berlioz
 Harriet Mabel Spalding (1862–1935), American poet, litterateur 	
 Harriet Elizabeth Prescott Spofford (1835–1921), American writer
 Harriet Bradford Tiffany Stewart (1798–1830), American missionary
 Harriet Beecher Stowe (1811–1896), American abolitionist and writer
 Harriet Anne Thiselton-Dyer (1854–1945), British botanical illustrator
 Harriet Toompere (born 1975), Estonian actress
 Harriet Tubman (1822–1913), American abolitionist
 Harriet Taylor Upton (1853–1945), American suffragette and author
 Harriet Merrick Warren (1843–1893), American editor
 Harriet Shaw Weaver (1876–1961), journalist and patron of James Joyce
 Harriet Wheeler (born 1963), English rock singer
 Harriet E. Wilson (1825–1900), first female African-American novelist
 Harriet Sohmers Zwerling (1928–2019), American beat writer

Fictional 
 Mad Harriet, DC Comics supervillain
 Harriet Arkham, daughter of the founder of Arkham Asylum in Batman comic books
 Harriet Hyde, Julia Jekyll's alter-ego in Julia Jekyll and Harriet Hyde
 Harriet Jones, British Prime Minister in Doctor Who
 Harriet Kepner-Avery, daughter of April Kepner and Jackson Avery in the television series Grey's Anatomy
 Harriet Morton, protagonist of Eva Ibbotson's novel A Company of Swans
 Harriet Schulenburg, character in the British sitcom Green Wing
 Harriet Sims, U.S. Navy officer in the TV show JAG
 Harriet Shelton, police officer in the British soap opera Doctors
 Harriet Smith, character from Jane Austen's novel Emma
 Harriet Vane, fictional mystery author in Dorothy L. Sayers' "Lord Peter" stories
 Harriet Vanger, character from the novel The Girl with the Dragon Tattoo
 Harriet Watson, John Watson's sister in the TV series Sherlock
 Harriet M. Welsch, title character of Harriet the Spy
 Harriet Broodal, fictional rabbit character in the video game Super Mario Odyssey
 Harriet the Turtle, from Franklin
 Harriet the Hamster Fairy, from the Rainbow Magic book franchise
 Harriet, a Simon Kidgits character developed by Simon Brand Ventures

Animals 
 Harriet (tortoise), a Galápagos tortoise which had an estimated age of 175 years at the time of her death

As a surname 
Fulchran-Jean Harriet

Notes 

English feminine given names
Scandinavian feminine given names
Scottish feminine given names
Welsh feminine given names